William Matthew Prior (May 16, 1806 – January 21, 1873) was an American folk artist known for his portraits, particularly of families and children.

Biography
The son of Captain William, a shipmaster, and Sarah Bryant Prior, William Matthew Prior was born in Bath, Maine, on May 16, 1806. Prior completed his first portrait in 1823, at the age of 17 after training under Charles Codman, another Maine-based painter.

In 1840, Prior moved to East Boston, Massachusetts, from his native Bath with his in-laws, notably fellow painter Sturtevant J. Hamblin, to invigorate his career as an artist. The paintings of Prior and Hamblin, when unsigned, are so similar in style as to be indistinguishable, and are commonly attributed to the "Prior-Hamblin School". According to the 1852 directory of Boston, Prior lived at 36 Trenton Street in East Boston.

He was a follower of the preacher William Miller, who prophesied that the end of the world was imminent. Prior wrote two books about Miller's teachings, The King's Vesture (1862) and The Empyrean Canopy (1868).

Prior died on January 21, 1873, and was interred at Woodlawn Cemetery in Everett, Massachusetts.

About 1,500 portraits are attributed to Prior. His works are in many museums and institutions around the United States including the Harvard Art Museums, Museum of Fine Arts, Boston, and the National Gallery of Art.

Prior is the subject of an exhibition, Artist and Visionary: William Matthew Prior Revealed, shown at the Fenimore Art Museum, Cooperstown, New York (May 26 – December 31, 2012) and subsequently at the American Folk Art Museum in New York City (January 24 – May 26, 2013).

Works

References

External links

 at National Gallery of Art

1806 births
1873 deaths
19th-century American painters
19th-century American male artists
American male painters
American portrait painters
Folk artists
Artists from Maine
Artists from Boston
People from Bath, Maine
People from East Boston, Boston